Farma 10 (The Farm 10) is the 10th season of the Slovak version of The Farm reality television show based on the Swedish television series of the same name. The show was filmed from August 2018 to November 2018 and premiered on August 30, 2018 on Markíza.

Format
Twelve contestants are chosen from the outside world and they are joined by six celebrities. Celebrities take roles as rich farmers while others are considered as poor farmer. Contestants from rich group cannot become Butlers, but they can be chosen as second dueler. After 5th week, contestants are merged into one group. Each week one contestant is selected the Farmer of the Week. In the first week, contestant who finds Farmer of the Week clue becomes Farmer of the Week. Since week 2, the Farmer is chosen by the contestant evicted in the previous week. For the first time there are group challenges for reward and individual challenges for immunity. Also for the first time, there was an elimination week in final week of the show and final three instead of final two.

Nomination process
The Farmer of the Week nominates two people (a man and a woman) as the Butlers. The others must decide which Butler is the first to go to the Battle. That person then chooses the second person (from the same sex) for the Battle and also the type of battle. The Battle winner must win three duels. The Battle loser is evicted from the game.

Ages stated are at time of contest.

Nominations

The game

References

External links
http://farma.markiza.sk
Farma Markíza 

The Farm (franchise)
2018 Slovak television seasons